Andries is a Dutch and Afrikaans masculine given name or surname equivalent to Andrew.

Given name
People with this name include

 Andries van Artvelt (1590–1652), Flemish painter
 Andries Beeckman (1628–1664), Dutch painter
 Andries Bekker (born 1983), South African rugby player
 Andries Benedetti (1615–1669), Flemish Baroque painter.
 Andries Bicker (1586–1652), Dutch merchant, leader of the Arminians, and VOC administrator
 Andries Boelens (1455–1519), Dutch mayor of Amsterdam
 Andries Bonger (1861–1936), Dutch artist, brother-in-law of Vincent van Gogh
 Andries Bosman (1621–1681), Flemish priest and painter,
 Andries Both (1612–1642), Dutch genre painter
 Andries Botha (c. 1800–c. 1870), South African leader of the Khoi people 
 Andries Botha (born 1952), South African artist and political activist
 Andries Brink (1877–1947), South African military commander
 Andries Brouwer (born 1951), Dutch mathematician and computer programmer
 Andries Burger (born 1981), Namibian cricketer
 Andries Carpentière (1672–1737), Dutch or French sculptor active in Britain
  , South African tenor 
 Andries Coetzee (born 1970s), South African linguist
 Andries Coetzee (born 1990), South African rugby player
 Andries van Cuijk (ca.1070–1139), Dutch bishop of Utrecht
 Andries van Dam (born 1938), Dutch-born American computer scientist
 Andries Danielsz. (c. 1580 – aft. 1640), Flemish flower painter
 Andries du Plessis (1910–1979), South African pole vaulter
 Andries van Eertvelt (1590–1652), Flemish painter, draughtsman and engraver
 Andries Ferreira (born 1990), South African rugby player
 Andries Gous (born 1993), South African cricketer
 Andries de Graeff (1611–1678), Dutch finance minister and mayor of Amsterdam
 Andries Cornelis Dirk de Graeff (1872–1957), Dutch minister for foreign affairs and Governor General of Dutch East Indies
 Andries Hendrik van Hasselt (1806–1874), Dutch-Belgian writer and poet 
 Andries Hoogerwerf (1906–1977), Dutch athlete, naturalist, ornithologist and conservationist
 Andries Hoogerwerf (political scientist) (born 1931), Dutch political scientist and public administration scholar
 Andries van Hoorn (1600–1660s), Dutch mayor of Haarlem
 Andries Hudde (1608–1663), Dutch landowner and colonial official of New Netherland
 Andries Jonker (born 1962), Dutch football player and manager
 Andries Kinsbergen (1926–2016), Belgian lawyer and politician
 Andries Lambert (ca.1844–1894), Nama leader
 Andries Mac Leod (1891–1977), Belgian-Swedish philosopher and mathematician
 Andries Mahoney (born 1985), South African rugby player
 Andries Malan (born 1994), South African badminton player
 Andries Maseko (1955–2013), South African footballer
 Andries Mpondo (born 1963), South African footballer
 Andries Nel (born ), South African government minister
 Andries Nieman (born 1972), South African boxer
 Andries Colyns de Nole (1598–1638), Flemish sculptor
 Andries Noppert (born 1994), Dutch footballer
  (1631–1681), Dutch playwright and poet
 Andries Pels (1655–1731), Dutch banker and insurer
 Andries Pevernage (1542–1591), Flemish composer
 Andries Jan Pieters (1916–1952), Dutch collaborator with Nazis who was executed for war crimes
 Andries Hendrik Potgieter (1792–1852), South African Voortrekker and politician
 Andries Pretorius (1798–1853), South African Boer leader after whom Pretoria is named
 Andries Pretorius (born 1985), South African rugby player in Wales
 Andries Putter (1935–2014), South African military commander
 Andries Sanders (born 1933), Dutch psychologist
 Andries Schutte (born 1994), South African rugby player
 Andries Jacobsz Stock (1580–1648), Flemish engraver, printmaker and illustrator
 Andries Stockenström (1792–1864), South African governor
 Andries Stockenström (1844–1880), South African judge, son of the above
 Andries van Straaden (1853–1919), pen name of Austrian writer Johannes Kaltenboeck
 Andries Strauss (born 1984), South African rugby player
 Andries Tatane (1978–2011), South African civil rights activist
 Andries Teeuw (1921–2012), Dutch critic of Indonesian literature
 Andries Treurnicht (1921–1993), South African Conservative politician
 Andries Vaillant (1655–1693), Dutch engraver and painter
 Andries Van Aarde (born 1951), South African theologist
 Andries Van den Abeele (born 1935), Belgian historical preservationist
 Andries van der Merwe (born 1994), South African sprinter
 Andries Venter (born 1986), South African rugby player
 Andries Vermeulen (1763–1814), Dutch painter
 Andries Vierlingh (1507–1579), Dutch dyke builder and polder creator
 Andries Waterboer (1789–1852), South African Griqua people leader
 Andries de Witt (1573–1637), Grand Pensionary of Holland

Surname
People with this name include
 Dennis Andries (born 1953), British former professional boxer
 Elena Andries (born 1994), Romanian weightlifter
 Jef Andries (1919–2006), Belgian footballer
 Koen Andries, Belgian professor
 Nick Andries (born 1990), American open-wheel racing driver

See also
Sint-Andries, suburb of Bruges in Belgium

Dutch masculine given names